This article is the Electoral history of Alexander Mackenzie, the second Prime Minister of Canada.  A Liberal, he served one term as Prime Minister (1873 - 1878).  He became Prime Minister after defeating the government of Sir John A. Macdonald on a non-confidence motion in 1873 and then winning the general election of 1874.  He later lost the general election of 1878 and Macdonald returned to power.

Prior to the creation of Canada in 1867, Mackenzie served in the Legislative Assembly of the Province of Canada, being elected in two general elections.  While a Member of Parliament in the Canadian House of Commons, he also served one term in the Legislative Assembly of Ontario, a practice of dual membership which was permitted at that time.  He served as Treasurer of Ontario Dec 1871 - Oct 1872.

Summary

Mackenzie ranks thirteenth out of twenty-three prime ministers for time in office, with one term in office (1873-1878).  He was in office for a total of 4 years and 336 days.  He led the Liberal Party in two general elections, winning one (1874) and losing one (1878).

Mackenzie was the second of five prime ministers from Ontario, the others being Macdonald, Mackenzie Bowell, William Lyon Mackenzie King, and Lester B. Pearson.

Mackenzie stood for election to the House of Commons of Canada eight times, in 1867, 1872, 1873, 1874, 1878, 1882, 1887 and 1891, including one ministerial by-election on becoming Prime Minister in 1873.  He was undefeated at the constituency level throughout his parliamentary career.  Mackenzie represented two different ridings in Ontario during his time in Parliament:  Lambton and York East, Ontario.  He served in the House of Commons for a total of 24 years, 6 months and 29 days, continuously from the first Parliament, elected in 1867, until his death in 1892.

Federal general elections, 1874 and 1878 

Mackenzie led the Liberal Party in two general elections, winning one (1874) and losing one (1878).

Federal Election, 1874 

Prime Minister Mackenzie formed his government in late 1873, after the fall of the Macdonald government in late 1873.  Mackenzie called the general election in early 1874.  He won a majority and was confirmed in office.  Macdonald retained the support of the Conservatives and became the Leader of the Opposition.

1 Prime Minister when election was called;  Prime Minister after the election.
2 Leader of the Opposition when election was called;  Leader of the Opposition after the election.
3 Election returns in 1874 did not require candidates to declare party affiliation.  Large numbers of candidates did not list a party affiliation.

Federal Election, 1878

In the 1878 election, Mackenzie and the Liberals were defeated by Macdonald and the Conservatives, who were returned to government.

1 Leader of the Opposition when election was called;  Prime Minister after the election.
2 Prime Minister when election was called;  Leader of the Opposition after the election.
3 Election returns in 1878 did not require candidates to declare party affiliation.  Large numbers of candidates did not list a party affiliation.

Federal Constituency Elections, 1867 to 1891
Mackenzie stood for election to the House of Commons eight times, in two different ridings in Ontario.  He was undefeated throughout his time in the House of Commons.

1867 Federal Election:  Lambton

 Elected.

1872 Federal Election:  Lambton

 Elected.
X Incumbent.

1873 Federal Ministerial By-Election: Lambton

 Elected.
X Incumbent.

1874 Federal Election:  Lambton

 Elected.
X Incumbent.

1878 Federal Election:  Lambton

 Elected.
X Incumbent.

The electoral district of Lambton was abolished in 1882.

1882 Federal Election:  York East

 Elected. 
X Incumbent.

1887 Federal Election:  York East

 Elected. 
X Incumbent.

1891 Federal Election:  York East

 Elected. 
X Incumbent.

Mackenzie served in Parliament until his death in 1892.

Ontario General Election, 1871
Mackenzie served one term as a member of the Provincial Parliament of Ontario, representing the riding of Middlesex West from March 21, 1871 to December 20, 1871. (Prior to 1873, individuals could be elected to both a provincial Legislature and the federal House of Commons, a practice ended by a federal statute enacted in 1873.)

Province of Canada General elections, 1861-1867
Mackenzie was elected to the Legislative Assembly of the Province of Canada twice, in the provincial general elections of 1861 and 1863, for a total of 6 years in the Legislative Assembly.  Throughout this period, he represented the riding of Lambton, Canada West, as a Reformer.

See also 

 Electoral history of John A. Macdonald - Mackenzie's predecessor and successor as prime minister.

References

External links 
 History of Federal Ridings since 1867

Mackenzie, Alexander